Trent Bridge is an iron and stone road bridge across the River Trent in Nottingham, England.  It is the principal river crossing for entrance to the city from the south, although the upstream Clifton Bridge is both larger and busier.

History

Medieval bridge

The first bridge is thought to have been constructed on the site in 920. A second bridge which was started in 1156 had more than 20 stone arches and a chapel dedicated to St. James at one end. It was maintained by a religious organisation. On 21 February 1551 the responsibility for repair passed to Nottingham Corporation, through a Royal Charter which created the Bridge Estate.

It was known as Hethbeth bridge, Heath-beth bridge, or Heck-beck bridge.

This bridge was damaged by floods several times, and the northern half was washed away in 1683. The repaired bridge had fifteen arches across the river and flood areas, giving openings covering 347 ft in a total length of 538 ft. Although it was repaired, the foundations had become unsafe and a project to replace it was started in the 1860s.

Modern bridge

The bridge was designed by Marriott Ogle Tarbotton. Construction started in 1868 and was completed in 1871 by Derbyshire iron maker, Andrew Handyside. The general contractor was Benton and Woodiwiss of Derby. It was completed for a cost of £30,000 (equivalent to £ as of ). There were three main cast iron arch spans each  braced by wrought iron girders. It is a Grade II listed building. The carving on the bridge was executed by Mawer and Ingle of Leeds.

The new Trent Bridge formed part of a series of works along the banks of the river to improve flood defences by the construction of stepped, stone embankments.

Between 1924 and 1926 the bridge was widened to 80 ft by the Cleveland Bridge & Engineering Company.

Bridge Estate

The Bridge Estate was created by a Royal Charter of King Edward VI on 21 February 1551 with Nottingham Corporation as Trustee. The objective was to provide funds to maintain and repair the Bridge.

In 1882 the funds exceed the requirement of the objective, and three new objectives were agreed:
Provide for the efficient maintenance and repair of Trent Bridge and the approaches to it.
To set up a contingency fund for the possible construction of such new bridge or bridges over the River Trent as may be found necessary or desirable.
The residue of such income is to be applied as the Trustee thinks best for the improvement of the City of Nottingham and the public benefit of its inhabitants.

In 1945 the Bridge Estate was registered as Charity 220716 with the Charity Commissioners.

Flood marks

On the northern abutment of the bridge, the high water marks reached by floods since 1852 have been carved into the stonework. This practice was started during the period when the Hethbeth bridge still existed, and those earlier marks were transferred onto the new bridge. To enable a comparison to be made with the peak levels, a graduated series of heights in feet above sea level has also been added.

Fame and popular culture

The bridge is one of Nottingham's most famous landmarks and sits at the heart of Nottingham's sporting district. The bridge lends its name to the nearby Nottinghamshire County Cricket Club Trent Bridge stadium, one of England's biggest and most famous cricket grounds.  Nottingham Forest FC's City Ground stadium and Notts County FC's Meadow Lane stadium are nearby. The bridge has also been used in as the backdrop for the regional BBC East Midlands Today and ITV Central News.

The Riverbank public house overlooks the bridge in its former tollhouse.

In December 2002, the Nottingham Princess river cruise boat crashed into the central column of the bridge when it lost control in strong currents.

See also
List of crossings of the River Trent

References 

Bridges in Nottingham
Bridges across the River Trent
Grade II listed buildings in Nottinghamshire
Bridges completed in 1871
Former toll bridges in England
Grade II listed bridges
West Bridgford